Mount Salisbury is an ice-free mountain, 970 m, standing at the west side of the lower Scott Glacier at the south end of the Karo Hills. First seen and roughly mapped by the Byrd Antarctic Expedition, 1928–30. Named by Advisory Committee on Antarctic Names (US-ACAN) for James B. Salisbury who made cosmic radiation studies at McMurdo Station in 1965.

Mountains of the Ross Dependency
Amundsen Coast